Liz Moran is an analytical chemist, and specialises in food analysis and law. She is a public analyst, a Fellow of the Royal Society of Chemistry and serves on an RSC board. She is Director of Technical and Quality at the multinational Eurofins. She is also MD of Public Analyst Scientific Services Limited, which is part of the Eurofins Life Sciences Group. Liz also sits on a Board of the Royal Society of Chemistry. She was President of the Association of Public Analysts. between 2012 and 2015.  In 2014, she was chosen as one of the 100 leading scientists by the Science Council. She was also chosen by the Royal Society of Chemistry as one of their 175 Faces of Chemistry. Liz has ran the London Marathon, completed the Three Peaks Challenge and done the K2B forty-miler twice.

Early life and education

Liz was born in Dublin and educated at Villiers School in Limerick, before relocating to England as a teenager where she attended Newlands School in Maidenhead. Inspired by an A-level supply teacher who devoted a term to food chemistry, she went on to study chemistry at third level. Between leaving school and university she worked as a Colour Technician for Imperial Chemical Industries (ICI) Dulux Paints, Slough.

She studied in Liverpool, taking a Bachelor of Science in Applied Chemistry and a Master of Science in Instrumental Chemical Analysis.  During this time, she also worked for Liverpool City Council, initially as a Laboratory Technician and later as a Senior Chemist at Liverpool City Analyst Laboratory where she tested food for composition and contaminants, consumer products, environmental analysis and forensic toxicology; it was in this latter role that she became interested in the role of public analyst, working on such diverse things as testing dyes, water, cement and post-mortem samples.

In 2006, she was awarded the Mastership in Chemical Analysis (MChemA) by the Royal Society of Chemistry, an exacting qualification required by The Food Safety Act 1990 to be appointed as a public analyst.

Career

After completing her Masters, Liz stayed with Liverpool City Council working as a Senior Chemist. In April 2003, she moved to Eurofins where she served as Analytical Services Manager for four years. Subsequent to this, she moved to Worcestershire County Council working as a Public Analyst & Scientific Adviser and Head of Worcestershire Scientific Services laboratory. In October 2011 she moved to a role as Deputy Head of Scientific Services for Public Analyst Scientific Services Limited where she has acted as public and agricultural analyst for local authorities in England and Wales and has a central business development role in the company. She subsequently studied for an MBA. Liz went on to become Head of Scientific Services at PASS and remains MD. In her principal current role she is one of the Directors at Eurofins, responsible for Quality & Technical.

In 2013, during the horsemeat scandal Liz was prominent in the media and found her way on to the BBC Breakfast red sofa, discussing food testing. She also gave evidence to the Environmental, Food and Rural Affairs Parliamentary Committee (EFRA).

In 2014, she was chosen as one of the 100 leading UK practising scientists by the Science Council, being recognised for  her long-standing commitment and leadership to public health in food, water, environment and consumer products.

References

Irish chemists
Irish women chemists
British chemists
British women chemists
Fellows of the Royal Society of Chemistry
Living people
Year of birth missing (living people)